In the law of the United States, the Code of Federal Regulations (CFR) is the codification of the general and permanent regulations promulgated by the executive departments and agencies of the federal government of the United States.  The CFR is divided into 50 titles that represent broad areas subject to federal regulation.

The CFR annual edition is published as a special issue of the Federal Register by the Office of the Federal Register (part of the National Archives and Records Administration) and the Government Publishing Office. In addition to this annual edition, the CFR is published online on the Electronic CFR (eCFR) website, which is updated daily.

Background
Congress frequently delegates authority to an executive branch agency to issue regulations to govern some sphere.  These statutes are called "enabling legislation."  Enabling legislation typically has two parts: a substantive scope (typically using language such as "The Secretary shall promulgate regulations to [accomplish some purpose or within some scope]" and (b) procedural requirements (typically to invoke rulemaking requirements of the Administrative Procedure Act (APA), Paperwork Reduction Act (PRA, codified at ), Regulatory Flexibility Act (RFA, codified at ), and several executive orders (primarily Executive Order 12866).  Generally, each of these laws requires a process that includes (a) publication of the proposed rules in a notice of proposed rulemaking (NPRM), (b) certain cost-benefit analyses, and (c) request for public comment and participation in the decisionmaking, and (c) adoption and publication of the final rule, via the Federal Register. Rulemaking culminates in the inclusion of a regulation in the Code of Federal Regulations.

Publication procedure
The rules and regulations are first promulgated or published in the Federal Register. The CFR is structured into 50 subject matter titles.  Agencies are assigned chapters within these titles.  The titles are broken down into chapters, parts, sections and paragraphs. For example, 42 C.F.R. § 260.11(a)(1) would indicate "title 42, part 260, section 11, paragraph (a)(1)." Conversationally, it would be read as "forty-two C F R two-sixty point eleven a one" or similar.

While new regulations are continually becoming effective, the printed volumes of the CFR are issued once each calendar year, on this schedule:

Titles 1–16 are updated as of January 1
Titles 17–27 are updated as of April 1
Titles 28–41 are updated as of July 1
Titles 42–50 are updated as of October 1

The Office of the Federal Register also keeps an unofficial, online version of the CFR, the e-CFR, which is normally updated within two days after changes that have been published in the Federal Register become effective. The Parallel Table of Authorities and Rules lists rulemaking authority for regulations codified in the CFR.

List of CFR titles 

The CFR is divided into 50 titles that represent broad subject areas:

 Title 1: General Provisions
 Title 2: Grants and Agreements
 Title 3: The President
 Title 4: Accounts
 Title 5: Administrative Personnel
 Title 6: Domestic Security
 Title 7: Agriculture
 Title 8: Aliens and Nationality
 Title 9: Animals and Animal Products
 Title 10: Energy
 Title 11: Federal Elections
 Title 12: Banks and Banking
 Title 13: Business Credit and Assistance
 Title 14: Aeronautics and Space (also known as the Federal Aviation Regulations)
 Title 15: Commerce and Foreign Trade
 Title 16: Commercial Practices
 Title 17: Commodity and Securities Exchanges
 Title 18: Conservation of Power and Water Resources
 Title 19: Customs Duties
 Title 20: Employees' Benefits
 Title 21: Food and Drugs
 Title 22: Foreign Relations
 Title 23: Highways
 Title 24: Housing and Urban Development
 Title 25: Indians
 Title 26: Internal Revenue (also known as the Treasury Regulations)
 Title 27: Alcohol, Tobacco Products and Firearms
 Title 28: Judicial Administration
 Title 29: Labor
 Title 30: Mineral Resources
 Title 31: Money and Finance: Treasury
 Title 32: National Defense
 Title 33: Navigation and Navigable Waters
 Title 34: Education
 Title 35: Reserved (formerly Panama Canal)
 Title 36: Parks, Forests, and Public Property
 Title 37: Patents, Trademarks, and Copyrights
 Title 38: Pensions, Bonuses, and Veterans' Relief
 Title 39: Postal Service
 Title 40: Protection of Environment
 Title 41: Public Contracts and Property Management
 Title 42: Public Health
 Title 43: Public Lands: Interior
 Title 44: Emergency Management and Assistance
 Title 45: Public Welfare
 Title 46: Shipping
 Title 47: Telecommunication
 Title 48: Federal Acquisition Regulations System
 Title 49: Transportation
 Title 50: Wildlife and Fisheries

History 
The Federal Register Act originally provided for a complete compilation of all existing regulations promulgated prior to the first publication of the Federal Register, but was amended in 1937 to provide a codification of all regulations every five years. The first edition of the CFR was published in 1938. Beginning in 1963 for some titles and for all titles in 1967, the Office of the Federal Register began publishing yearly revisions, and beginning in 1972 published revisions in staggered quarters.

On March 11, 2014, Rep. Darrell Issa introduced the Federal Register Modernization Act (H.R. 4195; 113th Congress), a bill that would revise requirements for the filing of documents with the Office of the Federal Register for inclusion in the Federal Register and for the publication of the Code of Federal Regulations to reflect the changed publication requirement in which they would be available online but would not be required to be printed. The American Association of Law Libraries (AALL) strongly opposed the bill, arguing that the bill undermines citizens' right to be informed by making it more difficult for citizens to find their government's regulations. According to AALL, a survey they conducted "revealed that members of the public, librarians, researchers, students, attorneys, and small business owners continue to rely on the print" version of the Federal Register. AALL also argued that the lack of print versions of the Federal Register and CFR would mean the 15 percent of Americans who don't use the internet would lose their access to that material. The House voted on July 14, 2014 to pass the bill 386–0. However, the bill failed to come to a vote in the Senate, and died upon the start of the 114th Congress.

See also
 Regulations.gov
 United States Reports
 California Code of Regulations
 Florida Administrative Code
 Illinois Administrative Code
 Code of Massachusetts Regulations
 List of CFR Sections Affected
 New Hampshire Code of Administrative Rules
 New Jersey Administrative Code
 New York Codes, Rules and Regulations
 Oregon Administrative Rules
 Pennsylvania Code

Notes

References

Further reading

External links 

 Electronic Code of Federal Regulations (eCFR) from the GPO
 Code of Federal Regulations (annual edition) on GovInfo from the GPO
 Code of Federal Regulations in the GPO's U.S. Government Bookstore
 Code of Federal Regulations (cross-referenced to U.S. Code) from Cornell LII
 Code of Federal Regulations (cross-referenced to U.S. Code) from GovRegs
 Sources and Tools to the Code of Federal Regulations free and commercial from LLSDC.org

 
Publications of the United States government